Sybra zebra is a species of beetle in the family Cerambycidae. It was described by Breuning in 1942. It is known to be from India.

References

zebra
Beetles described in 1942